Hoover ball  is a medicine ball game invented by President Herbert Hoover's personal physician, Medal of Honor recipient Joel T. Boone, to help keep then-President Hoover fit. The Hoover Presidential Library Association and the city of West Branch, Iowa co-host a national championship each year.

In general, the game is played on a volleyball-type court of grass or sand and involves throwing a heavily weighted medicine ball over the net. Officially, in Hooverball, the medicine ball weighs about 6 lb (2.7 kg) and is thrown over an 8 ft (2.4 m) volleyball-type net. The game is scored like tennis. The ball is caught and then thrown back. The weight of the medicine ball can make the sport quite physically demanding.

History

The sport was conceived shortly after Hoover's 1928 election.  On a trip to South America Hoover observed a game of "Bull-in-the-Ring" being played on the Battleship Utah.  Bull-in-the-Ring was popular among navy ships and was an inspiration for Hooverball.  In Bull-in-the-Ring the ball was soft and weighed 9 lb (4 kg).  The person in the middle of the circle was called the "bull".  While on these navy ships, Hoover enjoyed watching and playing the game. The net was 8.5 to 9 ft (2.6 to 2.7 m) high and 30 ft (9.1 m) wide.

Rules
Rules are usually determined "in house." However, the traditional rules are as follows:

 Points are scored when a team either fails to catch the return, fails to return the ball across the net, or returns the ball out of bounds. 
 The ball is served from the back line. 
 The serve is rotated among one team until the game is won. Teams alternate serving after each game. 
 The ball must be caught on the fly and immediately returned from the point it was caught. There is no running with the ball or passing to teammates. 
 Each team's court is divided in half. A ball returned from the front half of a team's court must be returned to the back half of its opponent's court. If the ball doesn't reach the back court, the opponent is awarded the point. 
 A ball that hits the out-of-bounds line is a good return. 
 A player who catches the ball out-of-bounds, or is carried out-of-bounds by the force of the ball, may return in-bounds before the return. 
 A ball that hits the net on its way over is a live ball. (If it was thrown from the front court, it must reach the opponent's back court to be good.) 
 Teams may substitute at dead ball situations. 
 Women serve from the mid-court line. 
 Women may pass once before a return. 
 Women may return the ball to any area of the opponent's court. 
 Good sportsmanship is required. Points in dispute are played over.

Ultimate Hooverball
 If there are more than four players on each team, there must be two medicine balls in play at all times.
 Throwing rules differ from regular Hooverball. If the ball is caught in the front of the court, it must be returned with a one-arm side-throw. If the ball is caught in the back half of the court, the ball must be returned with a two-handed, overhead pass.
 When catching the ball, the player's feet must remain firmly on the ground. If even one step is taken, that player is disqualified from that round, and must sit out the rest of that particular match, allowing the other team the advantage of having an extra player.*
 All original rules still apply.
 Any ages above 50 cannot play.

Types of throws
There are many different ways to get the ball over the net. Both power and control are important for a good throw, and can be achieved simultaneously with proper technique. Proper technique requires use of the whole body when throwing the medicine ball, not just the arms.

Body twist: The player holds the ball with both hands a little below the waist. Next, the player bends their knees slightly. To make the throw, the player twists a little more and at the same time pushes with their legs and throws with their arms. This can be a quick, off the hip throw. 
Over the head: The player faces away from the net and holds the ball in front of them about waist high with both hands. The player then bends their knees slightly. To make the throw the player uses their back as well as their arms and throws the ball over their head. This is the best way for a weaker player to serve the ball as it engages the whole body in the throw.
Trebuchet: This is a more advanced throw that is very effective. The player holds the ball in one hand, and fully extends their elbow off to the side of their body. To make the throw the player "cocks" their arm back while keeping the elbow straight, then takes a step forward, twists and releases the ball.
Spike: This throw can be used when the ball is caught in the front half of the court. Here the idea is for the player to jump as high as they can and throw the ball toward the opponents' back half. To make this throw the player holds the ball over their head, jumps up, and throws the ball over the net. The key to a successful spike is throwing the ball toward the ground as fast and hard as possible. The player does not want to lob the ball over the net in an arch; rather they want to throw it in a direct line to the opponents' back half.

Strategy
There are many strategies that are used when playing Hooverball.

Strong players known for powerful throws can fake a long throw by grunting and pretending to throw far while throwing gently and just getting the ball over the net. If done correctly the opponents will expect a throw to the back court and often will not have enough time to rush forward for the short ball.
"Picking" on a weaker opponent by constantly throwing the ball to them to wear them out. This will wear out an inexperienced player and often result in them missing a catch.  It's bad sportsmanship, though, and frowned upon.
Picking on an opponent but throwing the ball just to the same side each time.  This may move the player in that direction and open up a hole in the team's defenses.  
"Keep away" The heart of this strategy is keeping the ball away from the hands of the strongest member of the opposing team. Usually the strongest person will play the center so the idea is throw to the sides and corners to the other two players, assuming they are weaker.
270 Dunk of love. The player will catch the ball and then rotate in the air 270 degrees and then throw the red ball backwards over the half-line, thereby completing the dunk of love.

See also
 Medicine Ball Cabinet

References

External links
6 lb ball in action video clip from 20th Annual Hooverball National Championship in Iowa
Hooverball article at the Hoover Presidential Library
Hoover Presidential Foundation site on national championships
Baltimore Hooverball group

Ball games
Ball